Richard Gruenther (December 14, 1924 – March 18, 2015) was an American modern pentathlete. He competed in the 1948 Summer Olympics.

References

1924 births
2015 deaths
American male modern pentathletes
Olympic modern pentathletes of the United States
Modern pentathletes at the 1948 Summer Olympics
20th-century American people